= Nandihalli =

- Village
- Location in Karnataka, India Nandihalli (India)
- Coordinates: 15°43′43″N 74°33′20″E
- Country: India
- State: Karnataka
- District: Belgaum
- Talukas: Belgaum

Languages
  - Official: Kannada
- Time zone: UTC+5:30 (IST)

Nandihalli is a village in Belgaum of Karnataka, India.
